Union Chapel is a historic Methodist chapel located in Shelter Island Heights, Suffolk County, New York.  It was built in 1875 and is a wood-frame structure with wood-shingle sheathing.  The chapel's main three-bay facade has a -story bell tower with a double-door center entrance at its base; a small porch shelters the entry.  It is the most important extant structure associated with the Shelter Island Heights Grove and Camp Meeting Association, a Methodist camp established in 1872.

It was added to the National Register of Historic Places in 1984.

References

Properties of religious function on the National Register of Historic Places in New York (state)
Churches completed in 1875
Churches in Suffolk County, New York
National Register of Historic Places in Suffolk County, New York